Pandit Mothilal Government Model Higher Secondary School (PMGM HSS) is a school in the city of Palakkad, Kerala, India. It is situated near the Government Victoria College, Palakkad. It is under the management of the Kerala Department of Education. PMGM HSS is a primary, secondary and higher secondary co-educational school.

References

Schools in Palakkad
High schools and secondary schools in Kerala